Pandit Deendayal Upadhyaya Medical College, Churu is a full-fledged tertiary Medical college in Churu, Rajasthan. It was established in the year 2018. The college imparts the degree Bachelor of Medicine and Surgery (MBBS). Nursing and para-medical courses are also offered. The college is affiliated to Rajasthan University of Health Sciences and is recognised by Medical Council of India. The selection to the college is done on the basis of merit through National Eligibility and Entrance Test. D.B. general hospital, Churu and J.M.B. eye hospital, Churu are the associated hospitals with this college. The college has started its MBBS course from August 2018.

Courses
Churu Medical College, Rajasthan undertakes education and training of students MBBS courses.

References

External links 
 https://education.rajasthan.gov.in/content/raj/education/churu-medical-college--churu/en/home.html#

2018 establishments in Rajasthan
Affiliates of Rajasthan University of Health Sciences
Educational institutions established in 2018
Medical colleges in Rajasthan